Chromosome 16 open reading frame 46 is a protein of yet to be determined function in Homo sapiens. It is encoded by the C16orf46 gene with NCBI accession number of NM_001100873. It is a protein-coding gene with an overlapping locus.

Gene
An alternative name for this gene is FLJ32702, however it is most commonly referred to as C16orf46.

Location 
The C16orf26 gene is found on chromosome 16q23.2 negative strand. The promoter region is 1152 base pairs long. It has three exons, one from 1-380 bp, the second from 381 to 1254 bp, and the third from 1255 to 1982 bp.

Expression 
C16orf46 is broadly expressed in the testis and thyroid as well as 18 other tissues. These tissue expression patterns are found to be low to moderate (25-50%). When looking at tissue profiles, the highest expression is in the adult mammalian kidney, liver, prefrontal cortex, cerebellum, heart, and brain.

Protein

Protein Analysis 
The full C16orf46 protein is 417 amino acids long. It has no isoforms, and its most distant ortholog, Rhincodon typus (whale shark), also has no known isoforms. The molecular weight was found to be 45.8 kdal. The isoelectric point is 7.4, average for all proteins, and C16orf46 is electrically neutral.

C16orf46 is predicted to be found in the nucleus by all orthologs.

The secondary structure of C16orf46 has alternating alpha helices and beta sheets.

Protein Level Regulation 
In C16orf46, there is N-linked glycosylation, O-linked glycosylation, and SUMOylation.

There are phosphorylation sites found with the kinases CKII, CKI, PKC, and cdc2.

A coronavirus cleavage site is predicted at the 235 amino acid position. There are also tyrosine motif locations between amino acids 42-45 and 251–252.

Transcript Level Regulation 
mRNA folding on the 5' UTR predicts a stem loop twice in the area between base pairs 47–90.

Homologs

Orthologs 
C16orf46 has over 50 orthologs ranging from primate to chordate. The table below shows a representation of the diversity of C16orf46 by listing a selection of orthologs found using NCBI. When C16orf46 Homo sapiens was run through a multiple alignment sequence program, Clustal Omega, against 20 true orthologs and 16 distant orthologs, Trp74 and Pro212 were found to be conserved in all.

Paralogs 
C16orf46 has no known paralogs.

Mutations 
C16orf46 has been compared against Fibrinogen, a protein which mutates rapidly, and Cytochrome C, a protein which mutates slowly.

As can be seen below, when multiple species of the three proteins were plotted, C16orf46 more closely resembled that of Fibrinogen than Cytochrome C, suggesting a possible rapid mutation.

Interacting Proteins 
C16orf46 interacts with FAT3 which has been linked to neurite interactions during development. C16orf46 is thought to have coexpression with the PLAC8L1 and CFAP43 gene, both of unknown function.

Clinical Significance 
There are higher levels of C16orf46 expression in pancreatic adenocarcinoma tumor epithelia tissue compared to the control. There is also higher gene expression in patients with small-cell carcinoma compared to the control.

References 

Genes on human chromosome 16